The Flintstone House is a free-form, single-family residence in Hillsborough, California, overlooking and easily seen from the Doran Memorial Bridge carrying Interstate 280 over San Mateo Creek.

History

Design
The house was designed by architect William Nicholson and built in 1976 as one of several experimental domed buildings using new materials. It was constructed by spraying shotcrete onto steel rebar and wire mesh frames over inflated aeronautical balloons. All the interior surfaces are rounded, and the master bathroom has a floor of rocks instead of tiles. Originally off-white in color, the house was repainted deep orange in 2000, and one of the domes was later painted purple.

Nicknames
The house is known popularly as the "Flintstone House", from The Flintstones, a Hanna-Barbera Productions animated cartoon series of the early 1960s about a Stone Age family. It is also known as the Dome House, the Gumby House, the Worm Casting House, the Bubble House, and "The Barbapapa House", from Barbapapa, a character and series of books created by Annette Tison and Talus Taylor in the 1970s.

Disrepair, restoration and remodeling 
By the mid-1980s the house had fallen into disrepair, as water runoff from higher on the mountainside damaged the foundation, causing the walls to crack. After failed attempts at sealing the cracks, it was extensively restored in 1987.

San Francisco Bay Area architect Eugene Tsui undertook to remodel the house during the first decade of the 2000s. The results of Tsui's remodel appear as the "Edises Kitchen" project, pictured on Tsui's website. Tsui's original concept for the remodel, including a proposed complementary second residence on the property, is detailed in depth on his earlier site.

In late 2017, new owners installed large oxidized steel sculptures of dinosaurs, a woolly mammoth, a giraffe, and Fred Flintstone in the yard.

Complaint
The house was unpopular with some neighbors, and inspired the formation of a local architectural review board. In March 2019, the town of Hillsborough filed a complaint against the current owner of the house, Florence Fang. The complaint alleged that the current owner's modifications are a "public nuisance" and that she did not receive the proper permits for her modifications. In March 2019, Fang retained the law offices of former San Francisco Mayor Joseph L. Alioto and Angela Alioto to respond to the Hillsborough complaint. The lawsuit was settled in June 2021 allowing the modifications to stay, with Ms. Fang receiving $125,000 from the city.

Notes

External links 
 

Houses in San Mateo County, California
Houses completed in 1976